The Tennet people ('Tennet' in early language survey) are an ethnic group in South Sudan. Their language is also called Tennet. Their neighbors, the Lopit as well as the Lotuho, refer to them as Irenge, the name they called to Buya also. Tennet had adopted the culture of Lopit but they have their own traditional dances such as Lalu, Nyaliliya, Loduk, etc. Tennet people are multilingual. They can speak the languages of the neighboring communities such as Lopit, Lotuko, Pari, Buya, Murle, and Toposa. But they have maintained a strong ethnic identity and resisted assimilation from the neighboring communities by maintaining their culture and language among themselves. They continue to speak Tennet.

Location

The Tennet home area consists of fifteen (15) villages in north of Torit in [[Eastern Equatoria). Tennet population is estimated at about 30,000 people.

Early history
The Tennet have an account of how they were once part of a larger group, which also included what are now Murle, Didinga, and Laarim Boya, the other members of the Southwest Surmic language family. Members of a hunting party speared an oribi, but after cooking it, they drank the broth themselves instead of giving it to the elders according to custom. A disagreement arose, and in the end, they separated, splitting into four smaller groups. The other three groups have similar stories. Some estimates place this event in the early nineteenth century.

The Tennet learned iron-working from the Bari people. However, during Sudan's civil wars, blacksmith activity decreased.

Language

Tennet is a Nilo-Saharan, Eastern Sudanic, Surmic language. It has several of the features common in other Surmic languages: Implosive consonants, multiple strategies for marking number on nouns, a marked nominative case system, and VSO order but sentence-final question words.

Culture

Economy
The Tennet people practice swidden agriculture. They grow sorghum mostly on the plains below the villages, but they also cultivate fields on the mountainsides. They raise cattle, which are the main measure of wealth and are used for bride wealth, and they also hunt, fish, and raise goats and sheep. However, they are primarily dependent on sorghum, and drought can cause severe food shortages.

Governance
The Tennet communities are governed by the ruling age set, called the Machigi Looch, (this word means the rulers and the owners of the land). The Members of the Machigi Looch are young men who are old enough to participate in warfare (cattle raiding and defense of the village). They make decisions, but they are also held accountable by the retired Machigi Looch, the elders. A new group of Machigi Looch is initiated about every twelve years.

Music
Tennet music is pentatonic which is "Rugumon". Carved flutes are common around the villages, and drums are used during dances.

References

Bibliography 
 Arensen, Jonathan E. 1992. Mice are men: Language and society among the Murle of Sudan. International Museum of Cultures Publication, 27. Dallas: International Museum of Cultures.
 Arensen, Jonathan, Nicky de Jong, Scott Randal, Peter Unseth.  1997. "Interrogatives in Surmic Languages and Greenberg's Universals," Occasional Papers in the Study of Sudanese Languages 7:71–90. Nairobi: Summer Institute of Linguistics.
 Arensen, Jonathan E. 1998. "Murle categorization" in Gerrit Dimmendaal and Marco Last (eds.), Surmic Languages and Cultures. 181–218. Köln: Rüdiger Köppe Verlag.
 Dimmendaal, Gerrit. 1989. "On Language Death in Eastern Africa", in Dorian, Nancy C. (ed.), Investigating obsolescence: Studies in language contraction and death (Studies in the Social and Cultural Foundations of Language 7.)  Cambridge: Cambridge University Press
 Randal, Scott. 1995. "Nominal morphology in Tennet," M.A. thesis, the University of Texas at Arlington.
 Randal, Scott. 2000. "Tennet's ergative origins," Occasional papers in the study of Sudanese languages. 8:67-80. Nairobi: Summer Institute of Linguistics.
 Tucker, Archibald N. & Margaret A. Bryan. 1956. The non-Bantu languages of northeastern Africa. "Handbook of African languages, 3." London: Oxford University Press for International African Institute.

External links
 Ethnologue information on Tennet
 Focus On South: Facts About Eastern Equatoria State – Sudan Vision Daily.
 South Sudan: Changing of the guard – Interpress Source News Agency.

 Ethnic groups in South Sudan